ARP 410 Airlines (EN:State Enterprise Plant 410 Civil Aviation "Airline 410") was an airline based in Kyiv, Ukraine. It operated passenger and cargo services throughout Ukraine and to destinations in Europe, South-East Asia and Africa. It was established in May 1999 and its main base was Kyiv International Airport (Zhuliany), Kyiv. ARP 410 Airlines ceased operations in 2007.

Fleet 

The ARP 410 Airlines fleet includes the following aircraft (at March 2007):

2 Antonov An-24B
7 Antonov An-24RV
1 Antonov An-26
4 Antonov An-26B
2 Antonov An-30

References

External links

 Official website 
 Official website 

Defunct airlines of Ukraine
Airlines established in 1999
Ukrainian companies established in 1999